Burk Uzzle (August 4, 1938 in Raleigh, North Carolina) is an American photojournalist, previously member of Magnum Photos and president from 1979 to 1980.

Burk Uzzle (burkuzzle.com) has spent his life as a professional photographer.  Initially grounded in documentary photography when he was the youngest contract photographer hired by Life magazine at age 23, his work continues to reflect the human condition.  For sixteen years during the 1970s and 1980s, he was an active contributor to the evolution of Magnum and served as its President in 1979 and 1980.  While affiliated with the cooperative, he produced the iconic and symbolic image of Woodstock (showing Nick Ercoline and Bobbi Kelly hugging), helped people grasp an understanding of the assassination and funeral of Dr. Martin Luther King Jr., and powerfully projects comprehension of what it means to be an outsider - from Cambodian war refugees to disenfranchised populations without voice or agency to portraits of communities not identified on a roadmap. His life, philosophy, and continuing work was explored in the critically acclaimed 2020 documentary feature film F11 and Be There by director Jethro Waters.
 
His archive spans more than six decades and captures much of the history of analog and digital photography.  His current bodies of work rest deep in issues of social justice.  A dozen years ago, Uzzle returned to North Carolina and now lives and works in two century old industrial buildings located in downtown Wilson not far from where he was born.

Solo exhibitions

 2017 "Perceptions + Recognitions : African-Americans in Eastern North Carolina," Greenville Museum of Art, Greenville NC (Catalogue)
 2016 "Burk Uzzle: American Chronicle," North Carolina Museum of Art, Raleigh NC
 2016 "All About America: Photographs by Burk Uzzle," Ackland Art Museum UNC Chapel Hill, Chapel Hill NC (Catalogue) 
 2016 "Burk Uzzle Retrospective," Nasher Museum of Art at Duke University, Durham NC
 2015 "Burk Uzzle: American Puzzles," Steven Kasher Gallery, New York NY
 2012 "Burned," Laurence Miller Gallery, New York NY
 2011 "Burk Uzzle," Flanders Gallery, Raleigh NC
 2010 "Martin Luther King, Jr.," Wilson Arts Council, Wilson NC
 2009 "Woodstock," Florida Museum of Photographic Arts, Tampa FL
 2009 "Woodstock 40th Anniversary," Laurence Miller Gallery, New York NY
 2008 "Burk Uzzle Recent Work," Barton College, Wilson NC
 2007 "Just Add Water: America in Color," Laurence Miller Gallery, New York NY
 2006 "Burk Uzzle," Michael Dawson Gallery, Los Angeles CA
 2005 "A Family Named Spot," The Southeast Museum of Photography, Daytona Beach FL
 2004 "Burk Uzzle," Laurence Miller Gallery, New York NY
 2001 "America in the Seventies," Bodo Nieman Gallery, Berlin Germany
 1998 "Daytona Bike Week," Gallery Contempo, St. Augustine FL
 1996 "Correspondence Between Islands," Danforth Gallery, Portland ME
 1994 "Burk Uzzle Recent Work," The Photography Gallery, Drew University, Madison NJ
 1992 "A Progress Report on Civilization," The Chrysler Museum, Norfolk VA (Catalogue)
 1985 "Burk Uzzle," 253 Gallery, Norfolk VA
 1984 "All America: Photographs by Burk Uzzle," Philadelphia Museum of Art, Philadelphia PA
 1983 "Burk Uzzle," The Photographers' Gallery, London England
 1982 "Burk Uzzle," The Ffoto Gallery, Cardiff Wales
 1982 "Burk Uzzle," Open Eye Gallery, Liverpool England
 1980 "News from Cambodia," International Center of Photography, New York NY
 1979 "Burk Uzzle," Gallerie Agathe Gaillard, Paris France
 1979 "Burk Uzzle," Galerie Fiolet, Amsterdam Holland
 1979 "Burk Uzzle," Witkin Gallery, New York NY
 1979 "Burk Uzzle," Galerie Breitling, Berlin Germany
 1977 "Burk Uzzle," Aperion Workshop, Traveling exhibition
 1977 "Burk Uzzle," Columbia College, Chicago IL
 1974 "Burk Uzzle," Dayton Art Institute, Dayton OH
 1974 "Burk Uzzle," 831 Gallery, Birmingham MI
 1973 "Burk Uzzle," University of Massachusetts Art Gallery, Boston MA
 1971 "Burk Uzzle," Art Institute of Chicago, Chicago IL
 1970 "Typically American," International Center of Photography, New York NY
 1969 "Burk Uzzle," Riverside Museum, New York NY

Museum and public collections

 Ackland Art Museum, University of North Carolina at Chapel Hill
 Art Institute of Chicago
 Arts Council of Great Britain
 Bibliothèque Nationale de France
 Cameron Art Museum
 Chrysler Museum of Art
 Fogg Art Museum, Harvard University
 George Eastman House
 Greenville Museum of Art
 Henry Art Gallery, University of Washington at Seattle
 International Center of Photography NYC
 Library of Congress
 Metropolitan Museum of Art
 Museum of Modern Art
 Nasher Museum of Art, Duke University
 National Museum of Modern Art, Japan
 North Carolina Museum of Art
 Philadelphia Museum of Art
 Rijksmuseum Amsterdam
Santa Barbara Museum of Art
 Smithsonian Institution
 Stedelijk Museum
 University of Texas
 Weatherspoon Museum

Books, monographs, and anthologies

External links
 Burk Uzzle Official Website
F11 and Be There a feature documentary film about Burk Uzzle by Director Jethro Waters.
Burk Uzzle at Photography-Now.com
 
Remains photograph and [https://www.youtube.com/watch?v=fMIcn6LxVCM supporting film directed by Jethro Waters of the toppled Confederate Soldiers Monument in Durham, North Carolina.

References

1938 births
American photojournalists
Living people
People from Raleigh, North Carolina
Artists from North Carolina